Helcionopsis reticulatus is an extinct species of paleozoic monoplacophoran in the family Tryblidiidae.

References

Prehistoric monoplacophorans